Lydd-on-Sea is a modern village, mostly built after World War II, which consists mainly of bungalows built along the Dungeness coastal road south of Greatstone, Kent, England. The Southern Railway opened a railway station here in 1937 but was closed in 1967. Lydd-on-Sea is part of the ecclesiastical parish of Lydd, now several miles distant, which once had access to the sea. It now forms part of the civil parish of Lydd.

An island in a lake (created by gravel extraction) slightly to the northwest of Lydd-on-Sea is the site of a collection of sound mirrors designed by Dr William Sansome Tucker, to detect the approach of enemy aircraft, in the years before radar had been developed.

References

External links

Villages in Kent
Populated coastal places in Kent
Beaches of Kent
Lydd